"Blame It on the Double" is a song co-written and recorded by Canadian country rock artist Cory Marks. It was a promotional single from Marks' studio album Who I Am, and later became a single at German and British rock radio. The track was co-written by Kevin Churko and Kane Churko.

Background
Marks co-wrote the song with his producers Kevin Churko and Kane Churko in 2015. He referred to it as a "country/rock small town party anthem".

Critical reception
"Blame It on the Double" was named Top Country "Pick of the Week" for February 14, 2020, with the outlet saying it "has a fresh country sound with a signature rock feel".

Music video
The official music video for "Blame It on the Double" premiered on February 14, 2020.

Collaborative version

A new version of the song was released in April 2021, featuring Tyler Connolly, lead vocalist of Canadian rock band Theory of a Deadman, and Jason Hook, former lead guitarist of Five Finger Death Punch. This version of the track will be featured on the 2021 film The Retaliators.

Background
Marks decided to release a new version of "Blame It on the Double" because he felt it "needed to be heard". He cited Merle Haggard, Waylon Jennings, Pantera, and Ozzy Osbourne as both country and rock influences reflected in this song, and said that adding Tyler Connolly and Jason Hook to the track gave it "epic rock energy". Connolly said he "jumped at the chance" when asked to be on the track, calling Marks the "future of outlaw country music". Hook stated he was "honoured to be asked to contribute" and called Marks and co-writer / producer Kevin Churko "dear friends".

Critical reception
Dave Brooks of Billboard said the track "reflects on all the freedoms that come with the loss of control during a night out on the town". Chris Parton of Sounds Like Nashville called the song an "aggressive hard-rock anthem" noting "crunchy guitars and pounding drums with lyrics that nod to country greats". Kerry Doole of FYI Music News labelled the new version a "rockin' remake" of the original track.

Music video
The official music video for the second version of "Blame It on the Double" was filmed at a drive-in theatre in Los Angeles, California, and premiered on April 30, 2021. It features Marks, Connolly, and Hook, and integrates footage from the film The Retaliators as well.

Country Mix

Marks included a new "Country Mix" of the song on his extended play Nashville Mornings in June 2021. This version of the song was sent to Canadian country radio.

Music video
The official music video for the "Blame It on the Double - Country Mix" premiered on July 2, 2021. The video features Marks and Connolly each recording their own parts of the song whilst having fun in the process.

Awards and nominations

Notes

References

2020 songs
2020 singles
2021 singles
Cory Marks songs
Songs written by Cory Marks
Songs written by Kane Churko
Songs written by Kevin Churko
Song recordings produced by Kevin Churko